Vladimír Šmeral (16 October 1903, in Drásov – 15 March 1982, in Prague) was a Czech actor.

Life
Šmeral started acting in Zemské divadlo in Brno. He moved to Prague and acted in Liberated Theatre, E. F. Burian's theatre and Divadlo na Poříčí. His wife was Jewish, but he refused to divorce her in order to protect her during the World War II. He had an affair with his theatre co-star Adina Mandlová, who became pregnant. In 1944 he was sent to a concentration camp in Wroclaw. Mandlová was sending him packages with food. In December 1944 she suffered a miscarriage. Šméral managed to escape from the camp and Mandlová help to hide him in a hospital. After the war he was active in many National Front organizations, as a member of the Czechoslovak Communist Party. He became an actor in Vinohrady Theatre and taught at DAMU. He is buried at the Vyšehrad Cemetery.

Selected filmography
 Skeleton on Horseback (1937)
 The World Is Ours (1937)
 Jan Cimbura (1941)
 Mist on the Moors (1943)
 Rozina, the Love Child (1945)
 Čapek's Tales (1947)
 Silent Barricade (1949)
 Hotel for Strangers (1966)
 The End of Agent W4C (1967)
 The Most Beautiful Age (1968)
 Larks on a String (1970)
 Witchhammer (1970)
 Všichni proti všem (1977)

References

External links

Vladimír Šmeral in Czech National Theatre Archive
FDb.cz– Vladimír Šmeral (in Czech)

1903 births
1982 deaths
People from Brno-Country District
People from the Margraviate of Moravia
Communist Party of Czechoslovakia politicians
Czech male film actors
Czech male stage actors
20th-century Czech male actors
Burials at Vyšehrad Cemetery